Terenty Dmitrievich Deribas (28 March 1883 – 28 July 1938) was a Russian revolutionary, Chekist and later a 1st rank State Security Commissioner in the NKVD.

Deribas was born in the village of Uspenskoe, Kherson Governorate in to a prosperous Cossack family. He joined the Bolshevik Party in 1904.

In November 1918, Deribas joined the Cheka and the Red Army, and was chief of the political department of several divisions. He took part in suppression of counter-revolutionary uprisings, including those of Kronstadt and Tambov.

In 1929, Deribas was transferred as a representative of the OGPU to the Far East, where he led a massive repression. In 1931, he became a member of the board of the NKVD.

During the Great Purge, Deribas was removed from his post on accusations of Trotskyism (31 July 1937), then arrested (12 August 1937), sentenced to death (28 July 1938), and executed by shooting on the same day, at the firing range Kommunarka.

He was posthumously rehabilitated on 31 December 1957.

References 

The information in this article is partially based on that in its Russian equivalent.

1883 births
1938 deaths
Cheka officers
People from Kirovohrad Oblast
Old Bolsheviks
Communist Party of the Soviet Union members
Cheka
Commissars 1st Class of State Security
Executed Russian people
Russian people executed by the Soviet Union
Great Purge victims from Russia
Soviet rehabilitations
Ukrainian people of Spanish descent
NKVD officers
Russian Social Democratic Labour Party members